Foster Hall may refer to:

Foster Hall (Indianapolis, Indiana), listed on the National Register of Historic Places in Marion County, Indiana
Foster Hall (Las Cruces, New Mexico), listed on the National Register of Historic Places in Dona Ana County, New Mexico
Foster Hall (Prairie View, Texas), formerly listed on the National Register of Historic Places in Waller County, Texas, removed 1994.

Architectural disambiguation pages